Trifluoromethyltrimethylsilane (known as Ruppert-Prakash reagent, TMSCF3) is an organosilicon compound with the formula CF3Si(CH3)3. It is a colorless liquid.  The compound is a reagent used in organic chemistry for the introduction of the trifluoromethyl group. The compound was first prepared in 1984 by Ingo Ruppert and further developed as a reagent by G. K. Surya Prakash.

Preparation
The reagent is prepared from trimethylsilyl chloride and bromotrifluoromethane in the presence of a phosphorus(III) reagent that serves as a halogen acceptor.

Use in organic synthesis
In the presence of an anionic initiator (M+ X−), the reagent reacts with aldehydes and ketones to give a trimethylsilyl ether, the net product of insertion of the carbonyl into the Si-CF3 bond. Hydrolysis  gives trifluoromethyl methanols. The reagent also converts esters to trifluoromethyl ketones. A typical initiator is a soluble fluoride-containing species such as tetrabutylammonium fluoride; however, simple alkoxides such as KOtBu are also effective. The mechanism begins by generation of Si(CH3)3X and a highly reactive [CF3]− (trifluoromethide) intermediate. The [CF3]− attacks the carbonyl to generate an alkoxide anion. The alkoxide is silylated by the reagent to give the overall addition product, plus [CF3]−, thus propagating an anionic chain reaction. The reagent competes with the carbonyl for the reactive intermediate, rapidly sequestering [CF3]− in a reversibly-generated -ate complex [(CF3)2Si(CH3)3]−. This -ate complex is unable to react directly with the carbonyl, resulting in powerful inhibition of the chain reaction by the reagent. This inhibitory process is common to all anion-initiated reactions of the reagent, with the identity of the counter-cation (M+) playing a major role in controlling the overall rate.

The reagent has largely supplanted trifluoromethyllithium, which is not isolable and rapidly decomposes to yield lithium fluoride and difluorocarbene.

References

Trifluoromethyl compounds
Reagents for organic chemistry
Carbosilanes
Trimethylsilyl compounds